Skullerupholm is a manor house and estate located in Lejre Municipality, Denmark.

History
Skullerupholm was in the beginning of the 14th century owned by Anders Pedersen Uldsaks and probably his brother Sakse Pedersen Uldsaks. Sakse's daughter, Ingeborg Uldsaks, inherited the estate in 1355. She outlived her husband, Peder Jensen Grubbe, by more than 20 years. The estate was by then owned by several heirs. Ingeborg Uldsaks' son-in-law, Johan Olufsen Bjørn, was the sole owner of the estate from 1397.

After his death in 1416, Skullerupholm passed to his daughter Eline Johansdatter Bjørn and her husband Sten Basse. Skulderupholm was after their deaths the object of a legal dispute between several heirs and lenders. In 1454, Gerver Lunge, Johan Bjørnsen and Oluf Axelsen Thott were each awarded one third of the estate. Oluf Daa, 
Bishop of Roskilde, acquired all three stakes of the estate in 1457–61.

Skullerupholm was after the Reformation, in 1536, confiscated by the Crown. It was then operated as a royal fief. Mads Frithof was lensmann of the Skullerupholm from 1554 to1594. After Frithof's death, Skullerupgaard was divided into two tenant farms and placed under Roskildegård. After the introduction of Absolute monarchy in 1660, Skullerupholm was ceded to the magistrate in Copenhagen.

Johannes Fincke restored the manor of Skullerupgaard in 1664. It was later ceded to his father-in-law, Henrik Müller, one of the largest landowners in the country. It was from 1673 part of Skjoldenæsholm birk.

In 1688, Müller ceded  Skullerupgaard to his daughter Sophie Müller and her husband Johannes Fincke. In 1707, Sophie Müller sold the estate to Severin de Junge,

1748–present: Holstein-Ledreborg family
Skullerupholm was in 1748 acquired by Johan Johan Ludvig Holstein and incorporated into the County of Ledreborg.

The County of Ledreborg was in 1926 dissolved as a result of the lensafløsningsloven of 1919. The Holstein-Ledreborg family kept Skullerupholm but land for 10 new smallholds were sold off.

List of owners
 (1326-1337) Anders Pedersen Uldsaks
 (1326-1355) Sakse Pedersen Uldsaks
 (1355- ) Ingeborg Saksesdatter Uldsaks, gift Grubbe
 ( -1378) Peder Jensen Grubbe
 (1378-1397) Ingeborg Saksesdatter Uldsaks
 (1378- ) Ingeborg Pedersdatter Grubbe, gift Bjørn
 ( -1416) Johan Olufsen Bjørn
 (1416-1448) Sten Basse
 (1448-1451) Eline Johansdatter Bjørn, gift Basse
 (1448-1461) Torben Bille
 (1451-1461) Oluf AxelsenThott
 (1454-1457) Johan Bjørnsen
 (1454-1457) Gørvel Andersdatter Lunge
 (1457-1536) Roskilde bispestol
 (1536-1661) Kronen
 (1661-1664) Københavns Magistrat
 (1664- ) Johannes Fincke
 ( -1688) Henrik Müller
 (1688-1707) Johannes Fincke
 (1707-1711) Sophie Müller, gift Fincke
 (1711- ) Severin de Junge
 ( -1748) Emanuel de Junge
 ( -1748) Jens de Junge
 ( -1748) Ane Bolette de Junge
 ( -1748) Mariane Catharina Junge
 (1748-1763) Johan Ludvig Holstein
 (1763-1699) Christian Frederik Holstein
 (1699-1853) Christian Edzard Holstein-Ledreborg
 (1853-1895) Christian Edzard Moritz Holstein-Ledreborg
 (1895-1912) Johan Ludvig Carl Christian Tido Holstein-Ledreborg
 (1912-1951) Josef Ignatius Maria Holstein-Ledreborg
 (1951-1989) Knud Johan Ludvig Holstein-Le
 (1989- ) Silvia Charlotte Marie Holstein-Ledreborg, gift Munro

References 

Manor houses in Lejre Municipality